Acantuerta is a genus of moths of the subfamily Agaristinae of the family Noctuidae.

Species
 Acantuerta ladina Jordan, 1926
 Acantuerta thomensis Jordan, 1904

Agaristinae
Noctuoidea genera